The Halton District School Board serves public school students throughout Halton Region, including the municipalities of Burlington, Halton Hills, Milton and Oakville. Its administration area is to the southwest of the city of Toronto. In 2006-2007, it served almost 50,000 students, excluding those in adult, alternative, and Community Education programs.

History
Education in the former Halton County was previously governed by a framework of boards for various high school districts and public school districts associated with them. In 1967, as a result of initiatives undertaken by then Minister of Education Bill Davis, work was begun to amalgamate all boards on a county-wide level throughout the Province, and such a move was recommended to the Halton County Council that year for its approval. The move was opposed by the southern boards of education in Burlington and Oakville, but that was overruled upon passage of mandatory legislation by the Legislative Assembly of Ontario in 1968.

The Board was constituted as the Halton County Board of Education, which was established on January 1, 1969. When the County was replaced by the Regional Municipality of Halton, the Board became the Halton Board of Education.

As part of the province-wide restructuring of Ontario's school boards as a consequence of the passage of the Fewer School Boards Act, 1997, the English-language Public District School Board No. 20 was created to take over the Region's schools. It was merged with the former Board at the beginning of 1998, and was renamed as the "Halton District School Board" in 1999.

Schools
The Board operates 76 elementary schools, and 17 secondary schools, which are organized into the following areas:
 East Area (Oakville)
 North Area (Halton Hills and Milton)
 West Area (Burlington)

Secondary school enrollment and Fraser Institute provincial rankings are as follows:

Trustees

Student Trustees 
As required by the Ontario Ministry of Education, the following student trustees have been named to serve on the Board:

Board of Trustee Chairs & Vice-Chairs 
The Halton District School Board's Board of Trustees annually elect its chair and a vice-chair at its Annual Organization Meetings (AOM). The current chair of the Halton District School is Margo Shuttleworth and the current vice-chair is Tracey Ehl Harrison.

Other 
The Board also operates the following specialized facilities:
Gary Allan High School - for adult, alternative and Community Education programs.
Syl Apps School

Programming 

The Pathways programme encourages all post-secondary options, from apprenticeship, to college, to university, to the workplace. The Board has also introduced specialist high skills majors and other unique programs for students, including fully online high school credits.

The International Baccalaureate programme is offered at:
 Georgetown District High School
 Burlington Central High School
 White Oaks Secondary School
 Craig Kielburger Secondary School (IBDP candidate school)

See also
 Halton Catholic District School Board
 Ontario Student Trustees' Association
 List of school districts in Ontario
 List of high schools in Ontario

References

School districts in Ontario
Education in Burlington, Ontario
Education in the Regional Municipality of Halton